The Coppa dell'Amicizia (Cup of Friendship) was a summer association football friendly tournament for clubs and nations, which were held in a friendly in the time frame between 1959 and 1968. The first was named the Cup of French-Italian Friendship, a tournament for the seasons 1959, 1960 and 1961 saw teams compete against Italian and French. The tournament provided that each of the participants were opposed to one another nation with the formula of round trip, and that the points he had accumulated in a general classification to describe the winning nation. Five teams participated in the first edition of Representative, in the second 16 and third 10.

In 1962 took place the first and only edition of the Cup of French-Italian-Swiss Friendship. 16 teams (6 Italian, 6 French and 4 Swiss) for a tournament with the classical formula of second round, quarterfinals, semifinals and final, all articulated to lots of return. The following year saw still faced club French and Italian (four per representative), but this time with a formula similar to that of 1962 (quarterfinals, semifinals and final) to designate a single winner.

The next competition named the Cup of Italian-Spanish Friendship. Juventus F.C. and Real Madrid agreed to play two matches, one in Turin, and the second in Madrid. The first edition (one match 1:3) was held in Turin in 1963, the second (revenge 0:2), because of the many obligations of the two clubs was played in Madrid in 1965. The perfect tie at the end of the two games (at the time the away goal they had double value), determined the need to resort to penalties for the final allocation of the trophy.

The last Cup is finally the Cup of Italian-Swiss Friendship, two editions held in 1967 and 1968. The tournament took place entirely on earth Switzerland with the participation of three Italian and three Swiss teams. Each team met with the formula of one-way, three participants from the country and the winner turned out the one with the highest number of points counted in one overall ranking.

Finals

References

External links
 Cup of French-Italian Friendship at Rec.Sport.Soccer Statistics Foundation.
 Cup of Italian-Swiss Friendship at Rec.Sport.Soccer Statistics Foundation.

Defunct Italian football friendly trophies
Defunct international club association football competitions in Europe
Recurring sporting events established in 1959
Recurring events disestablished in 1968
1959 establishments in Italy